Clanwilliam may refer to:
 Clanwilliam (County Tipperary), barony in Ireland
 Earl of Clanwilliam, title in the Peerage of Ireland
 Clanwilliam Rugby Club, in Tipperary
 Clanwilliam (County Limerick), barony in Ireland
 Clanwilliam, Western Cape, town in South Africa
 Clanwilliam, Manitoba, rural municipality in Canada

See also
Clanwilliam redfin, a fish species native to South Africa
Clanwilliam yellowfish, a fish species native to South Africa
Clanwilliam sandfish, a fish species native to South Africa
Clanwilliam rock-catfish, a fish species native to South Africa
Sawfin or Clanwilliam sawfin, a fish species native to South Africa
Widdringtonia wallichii or Clanwilliam cypress, a tree species native to South Africa
Clanwilliam Dam, a dam in South Africa